Cold Spring station may refer to the following rail stations in the United States:

 Cold Spring station (Metro-North), a commuter rail stop on the Metro-North Railroad's Hudson Line
 Cold Springs Station Site, a historic stagecoach station site west of Austin, Nevada
 Cold Spring Lane station, a light rail station in Baltimore, Maryland
 West Cold Spring station, a Metro subway station in Baltimore, Maryland